Birgit Sadolin, (born 10 October 1933) is a Danish actress. She entered film in 1953 with the comedy Ved Kongelunden.

Filmography 

 Ved Kongelunden – 1953
  – 1954
 Altid ballade – 1955
 På tro og love – 1955
  – 1956
  – 1957
 Der brænder en ild – 1962
  – 1965
 En ven i bolignøden – 1965
 Dyden går amok – 1966
 Flagermusen – 1966
 Min søsters børn – 1966
  – 1967
 Sjov i gaden – 1969
 Pigen fra Egborg – 1969
 Nitten røde roser – 1974
 Strømer – 1976
 Slægten – 1978
 Johnny Larsen – 1979
  – 1983
 Baby Doll – 1988
  – 1989
 Dansen med Regitze – 1989
  – 1992
 Frække Frida og de frygtløse spioner – 1994
 At kende sandheden – 2002

References

External links 
 

Danish film actresses
Living people
People from Gentofte Municipality
Best Actress Bodil Award winners
1933 births